The Sanjak of Zvornik was one of the sanjaks in the Ottoman Empire with Zvornik (in modern-day Bosnia and Herzegovina) as its administrative centre. It was divided into 4 different districts: Žepče, Maglaj, Tuzla and Kladanj. The sanjak was created between 1478 and 1483. Following its dissolution in 1878 after the Austro-Hungarian Empire defeated the Ottomans, Zvornik became part of the Zvornik Kotar.

During the Ottoman period, Zvornik was the capital of the Sanjak of Zvornik (an administrative region) within the Bosnia Eyalet. This was primarily the case because of the city's crucial role in the economy and the strategic importance of the city's location. The Sanjak of Zvornik was one of six Ottoman sanjaks with most developed shipbuilding (besides sanjaks of Vidin, Nicopolis, Požega, Smederevo and Mohač). In the year 1806 the city of Zvornik was home to the famous Bosniak, kapetan Mehmed-beg Kulenović.

References

Ottoman period in the history of Bosnia and Herzegovina
Sanjaks of the Ottoman Empire in Europe
Sanjak of Zvornik
1478 establishments in the Ottoman Empire
1878 disestablishments in the Ottoman Empire